Dominique Arnold (born September 14, 1973, in Compton, California) is an American hurdling athlete. He is tied for being the fifth fastest all-time 110 m hurdler, with a time of 12.90 s (+1.1 m/s), which was the American record from 2006 till 2010. Arnold set that mark in Lausanne, where he beat the current world record but lost to Liu Xiang. His performance is still the fastest losing time ever ran for the event.

In competition, Arnold finished fourth at the 2005 World Championships in Athletics and took bronze in the 60 m hurdles at the 2006 World Indoor Championships in Athletics. He also took bronze at the 2001 IAAF Grand Prix Final and silver at the 2005 World Athletics Final.

References

External links
 
 Dominique Arnold at USATF
 All Time Top 110 Meter Hurdle Performances
 Flotrack Interviews of Dominique Arnold (video)

1973 births
Living people
American male hurdlers
Sportspeople from Compton, California
Athletes (track and field) at the 1999 Pan American Games
Pan American Games track and field athletes for the United States